Raymond William Trognitz (born June 11, 1953) is a Canadian former professional ice hockey player who played in the World Hockey Association (WHA). Trognitz played part of the 1977–78 WHA season with the Cincinnati Stingers. He was drafted in the sixth round of the 1973 NHL Amateur Draft by the California Golden Seals.

Trognitz is most noted for signing with the Stingers on November 7, 1977, just four days after the International Hockey League (IHL) had banned him for life for the damage he inflicted on the Port Huron Flags' Archie Henderson while a member of the Dayton Owls at the conclusion of a match-ending, bench-clearing brawl at the McMorran Place ice arena nine days prior on October 29. He had first come to the defense of teammate John Flesch by jumping Henderson from behind and breaking his nose with one of his punches. When Henderson later charged him looking for a fight, Trognitz swung his stick and cut him across the forehead. He accumulated 63 minutes in penalties, while Henderson ended up with a broken nose, eight stitches to the forehead, a slight concussion and an overnight stay at a Port Huron hospital. Needing an enforcer to protect its younger skilled players, the Stingers signed Trognitz to a contract in which he was paid $150 for each of ten games. He dressed for all ten, played in seven and picked up 37 penalties minutes which included 25 in one contest against the Quebec Nordiques. He was offered another ten-game contract but rejected it, saying, "What's $150? I got guys making $150,000 hiding behind my back."

References

External links

1953 births
California Golden Seals draft picks
Canadian ice hockey left wingers
Charlotte Checkers (SHL) players
Cincinnati Stingers players
Columbus Owls players
Fort Worth Texans players
Grand Rapids Owls players
Ice hockey people from Ontario
Living people
Sportspeople from Thunder Bay
Toledo Goaldiggers players
Tucson Rustlers players